Belas Rugby Clube is a rugby union team based in , Sintra Municipality, Portugal. 

Established in 1975 (as a rugby union section of Clube Desportivo de Belas), RC Belas are the only rugby union team in their area, which comprises the freguesias (civil parishes) of Queluz e Belas and Massamá e Monte Abraão in Sintra municipality, as well as the Western part of Amadora municipality. They have never played in the Portuguese top tier, despite achieving some success at the lower levels (e.g. 3rd tier national champions in 2006).

External links
Belas Rugby Clube

Portuguese rugby union teams